Lauren Nicole Chamberlain (born July 2, 1993) is an American retired softball infielder. Chamberlain played college softball for the Oklahoma Sooners softball from 2012 to 2015. A collegiate All-American, she was part of the 2013 Women's College World Series championship team. She is the NCAA Division I career leader in slugging percentage. She also holds the school and Big 12 Conference career lead in RBIs, walks, total bases and runs. She was drafted #1 and played professional softball for the USSSA Pride of National Pro Fastpitch from 2015 to 2018, winning a title in her final season in 2018.

Collegiate career
Born in Orange, California and raised in Trabuco Canyon, Chamberlain graduated from El Toro High School in Lake Forest.

At the University of Oklahoma, Chamberlain played at first base for the Oklahoma Sooners from 2012 to 2015

As a freshman in 2012, she set the Big 12 Conference's single-season home run record, hitting thirty home runs; she finished second in the nation in home runs that year. She was the first freshman in Big 12 softball history to win the Big 12 Player of the Week award three times. That season, she led her team in home runs, RBI, runs scored, and total bases; second in walks; and third in batting average, hits, doubles, and stolen bases. Following the season, she was named to the All-Big 12 and National Fastpitch Coaches Association All-American first teams and Big 12 Freshman of the Year.

In 2013, Chamberlain led the nation in four statistical categories, including home runs; home runs per game; slugging percentage; and runs per game. She ranked in the top ten nationally in four other statistical categories, including on-base percentage and batting average. She set eight single-season school offensive records, including for batting average; slugging percentage; on-base percentage; runs scored; RBI; extra-base hits; total bases; and walks. Chamberlain helped lead the Sooners to the National Championship in 2013. Following the season, she was again named a first-team all-American and a member of the all-conference first team.

In 2014, Chamberlain only played in thirty-nine games after she suffered a back injury in March and a partially-torn right PCL in May. In the games she did play, Chamberlain hit twelve home runs and led her team in on-base percentage and walks. Her fifty-one (51) walks is the sixth-best mark in Big 12 conference history. Despite the time missed due to injury, she was named a third-team all-American after the season.

Entering 2015, Chamberlain needed eighteen home runs to tie the all-time record. She led the team in six statistical categories, including runs, RBI, slugging percentage, and on-base percentage; she led the Big 12 conference in on-base percentage; slugging percentage; walks; and runs per game. On April 30, 2015, Chamberlain hit a grand slam in a game against North Texas pitcher Kenzie Grimes; with the home run, the 91st of Chamberlain's career, she moved into sole possession of first place all-time on the NCAA career home run list. She finished her career with 95 home runs. She held the NCAA career home run record until Jocelyn Alo broke her record on March 11, 2022. Following her senior season, Chamberlain was nominated for the Honda Cup Award and was named the Big 12 conference's Female Athlete of the Year. She was named to both the all-American first-team as well as the Big 12 first-team. Chamberlain retired from professional softball on May 31, 2019, prior to the NPF season.

International career
Chamberlain played for Team USA in 2013. She previously spent two years (2010–11) as a member of the Junior Women's National Team and was named the 2010 USA Softball Athlete of the Year for the JWNT.

Professional career
Chamberlain was selected with the #1 overall draft pick in the 2015 NPF Draft by the USSSA Pride. In thirty-eight games with the Pride during the 2015 summer season, Chamberlain hit .205 with five home runs and eleven RBI.

Chamberlain was featured in ESPN The Magazines Body Issue 2018. She now hosts a YouTube show for Major League Baseball.

Career statistics

Awards and honors
• Big 12 all-Conference First-Team (2012, 2013, 2015)
• Big 12 Champion (2012, 2013, 2014, 2015)
• NFCA First-Team All-American (2012, 2013, 2015)
• NFCA Third-Team All-American (2014)
• NCAA Player of the Year Finalist (2013, 2015)
• Big 12 Female Athlete of the Year (2015)
• ESPY's Nominee 'Best Record Breaking Performance' (2015)
• NCAA National Champion (2013)

External links 
 
 
 Lauren Chamberlain on Facebook
 Lauren Chamberlain Career NPF Stats
 Lauren Chamberlain Career NCAA Stats

References

1993 births
Living people
Oklahoma Sooners softball players
Sportspeople from Orange, California
Softball players from California
USSSA Pride players